Dmitri Viktorovich Pokrovsky (3 May 1944 – 29 June 1996) was a Russian folk music researcher and musician, best known for his efforts to rediscover authentic, and often near extinct rural musical traditions, from many different regions of Russia, and re-enacting them with the Dmitri Pokrovsky Ensemble.

References

External links
 The Dmitri Pokrovsky Ensemble

1944 births
1996 deaths
Russian musicians
Russian ethnic music
Russian folk music